Arletta Faidiga (born 1 August 1938) is an Italian former swimmer. She competed in the women's 100 metre backstroke at the 1960 Summer Olympics.

References

External links
 

1938 births
Living people
Olympic swimmers of Italy
Swimmers at the 1960 Summer Olympics
Sportspeople from Rijeka
People from Rijeka
Italian female backstroke swimmers